Daniel Göhlert (born 25 September 1980) is a German former professional footballer who played as a defender.

References

External links
 

1980 births
Living people
Sportspeople from Chemnitz
Association football defenders
German footballers
Chemnitzer FC players
1. FC Union Berlin players
2. Bundesliga players
3. Liga players
Footballers from Saxony